Ercole Bazzicaluva, also spelled Bezzicaluva or Bazzicaluve (active 1640), was an Italian engraver of the Baroque period.

Biography
He was born in Pisa. He was active in Florence from the first half of the 17th century. Dedicating his series of "few and fake countries" to the Grand Duke of Tuscany on Oct. 24th 1638, Bazzicaluva  declared himself being originated “of Pisa"; but then, in the margins of the first of some military episodes of 1641, he is called "Florentine" (perhaps due to the fact that Pisa was part, for more than a century, of the State of Florence)As for his birth year, no one has ever succeeded in establishing it exactly, nor can we accept, even as an approximate one, the date of 1600 proposed by De Boni, because in 1638 he presented his engravings to the Grand Duke Ferdinando II of Tuscany. He defined them as "young first fruits", which "like unripe fruits wait to mature": what he would certainly not have said if he had already been 38 years old. It is more likely that he  was born around 1610, that is almost at the same time as Della Bella, with whom he shared the school and in a certain sense the style.

He was signing his works Bazzicaluva (even with only one z) or Bezzicaluve; but this surname, already taken as a nickname, in his family was quite recent, because his ancestors were called "Fregoni", as we can deduce from a document dated 1599, in which we find an "Alessandro Fregoni aliter Bezzica l'Uve".

In 1641, that is three years after the "few and fake countries" that Bazzicaluva  had dedicated to the Grand Duke, wishing him to possess "so many real worlds that Anaxagoras could not even imagine ", was published the tragic-heroic poem Le pazzie de'savi, or rather the Lambertaccio by Bartolomeo Bocchini, with 13 small illustrations of executed by Bazzicaluva that  re-echoed the same roar of arms in which he, as a man, loved to live most of his days.

Apart from being an engraver, Bazzicaluva was also field master of the Grand Duke, court chamberlain in Innsbruck, castellan of the fortress of Livorno and governor of that of Siena.

The four Military Episodes of 1641 represented precisely: two cavalry charges, a naval combat, a march of cavalry, and among the first "fake countries" there are even a Chase of Fleeing Horses and an Attack of Brigands.

Bazzicaluva earned the praise of another powerful man of his time, Alessandro Visconti, who, by family tradition and personal inclination, fancied hunting, and he dedicated a series of "hunts" to him: the Departure, the Return, the Wild Boar Hunt, the Navigable River, the Stop, as well as the Appointment, a Landscape in a round frame and a Strange Entrance to the Monastery.

He was a pupil of Girolamo Parigi, and became castellan of the castle of Livorno. Bartsch describes seven of his prints, and Brulliot others. Of his works may be mentioned a Triumphal Procession, and twelve landscapes. He is described as a follower of the styles of Stefano della Bella and Jacques Callot. He painted a canvas for the church of Santi Stefano e Niccolao in Pescia.

References

People from Pisa
Italian engravers
Italian Baroque painters
Painters from Tuscany
17th-century Italian painters
Italian male painters
Year of death unknown
Year of birth unknown